(born May 31, 1992) is a Japanese football player. He currently plays for Ulsan Hyundai in K League 1.

International career
He made his debut for Japan national football team on 25 March 2021 in a friendly against South Korea.

Club statistics
Updated 25 March 2021

Honours

Club
Urawa Red Diamonds
Emperor's Cup: 2021
Japanese Super Cup: 2022

References

External links
Profile at Omiya Ardija

Twitter account

1992 births
Living people
Ryutsu Keizai University alumni
Association football people from Hyōgo Prefecture
Japanese footballers
Japan international footballers
J1 League players
J2 League players
Thespakusatsu Gunma players
Omiya Ardija players
Kashiwa Reysol players
Urawa Red Diamonds players
Association football midfielders